The European Republicans Movement (MRE) is a minor social-liberal political party in Italy.

From 2007 to 2010 the party was a founding member and associate of the Democratic Party, the leading centre-left party in Italy. In 2011 the MRE was merged into the Italian Republican Party, the party from which it had seceded in 2001. The MRE was also a member of the pan-European European Liberal Democrat and Reform Party (ELDR), and its long-standing leader was Luciana Sbarbati.

History
In 2001 the Italian Republican Party (PRI), after five years within the centre-left coalition, decided to join the centre-right House of Freedoms instead. The MRE was formed by those Republicans who refused such a decision and wanted to remain in the centre-left. The MRE took part in the consolidation of The Olive Tree as a joint centre-left electoral list both for the 2004 European Parliament election and the 2006 general election, along with the Democrats of the Left and Democracy is Freedom – The Daisy. The list won 220 out of 630 deputies (including two Republicans, Luciana Sbarbati and Adriano Musi) as part of The Union.

In 2007 the MRE was a founding member of the Democratic Party (PD), but continued to exist as an associate party and retained almost entirely its autonomy. In the 2008 general election, Sbarbati and Musi were elected to the Senate and often distinguished themselves from Democrats in key votes. Notably, they opposed European Parliament electoral law reform in 2009.

The common battle against electoral reform favored a reconciliation with the PRI. During the 2009 congress of the MRE the two parties signed a joint declaration, under which - despite their different coalition allegiances - they pledged to join forces on key issues, especially those concerning civil liberties and freedom of research.

In April 2010, Sbarbati led the MRE out of the PD and joined the Union of the Centre (UdC) in the Senate. In January 2011 the party sought a reconciliation with the PRI, which was reached two months later.

Following the decision of the PRI to join the centre-right coalition in the 2020 regional elections, the MRE split away from it again and regained its autonomy. The two parties ran in separate coalitions during the 2022 elections: the MRE joined the Democratic Party - Democratic and Progressive Italy list, while the PRI joined the Action - Italia Viva list.

Leadership
Secretary: Luciana Sbarbati (2001–2011, 2020–present)
President: Adriano Musi (2001–2010); Niccolò Rinaldi (2020–present)

References

External links
Official website
 Semi-official website

2011 disestablishments in Italy
2001 establishments in Italy
2020 establishments in Italy
Political parties disestablished in 2011
Political parties established in 2001
Political parties established in 2020
Liberal parties in Italy
Pro-European political parties in Italy
Social liberal parties
Radical parties in Italy